Forlivese is the central variety of Romagnol language spoken in the city of Forlì and in its province.

In Italian-speaking contexts, Forlivese (like most of the other non-Italian language varieties spoken within the borders of the Italian Republic) is often generically called a "dialect". This is often incorrectly understood as to mean a dialect of Italian, which actually is not the case. Forlivese and Italian are different languages and are not mutually intelligible. Forlivese is a central Romagna variety and is intelligible to speakers of other neighbouring Romagna varieties. 

Like all other dialects of Romagna, Forlivese is a Western Romance language related to French, Romansh and Italian.

However, the use of Forlivese is mostly limited to familiar terms and sentences, and is rare amongst Forlì inhabitants.

Some pieces of literature and a recent translation of the Gospels are available.

References 

Languages of Emilia-Romagna
Emilian-Romagnol language